Roseaplagis is a small genus of sea snails in the family Trochidae, the top snails.

Species
There are four species in the genus Roseaplagis:
 Roseaplagis artizona (A. Adams, 1853)
 Roseaplagis caelatus (Hutton, 1884)
 Roseaplagis mortenseni (Odhner, 1924)
 Roseaplagis rufozona (A. Adams, 1853)

References

 Donald K. & Spencer H. G. (2016). Phylogenetic patterns in New Zealand and temperate Australian cantharidines (Mollusca: Gastropoda: Trochidae: Cantharidinae): trans-Tasman divergences are ancient. Molecular Phylogenetics and Evolution. 100: 333-344